Pierre-Philippe-Alexandre Panon Desbassyns de Richemont (29 January 1833 – 11 November 1912) was a French archaeologist, historian and politician.
Between 1871 and 1882 he represented French India first in the National Assembly and then in the Senate.

Birth and family

Pierre Desbassyns de Richemont was born on 29 January 1833 in Paris.
He was descended from Augustin Panon (1664–1749), a carpenter who was born in Toulon and emigrated to Réunion in 1689.
Augustin's son was Augustin Panon (Réunion: 1694–1772), a member of the Pondicherry high council.
His son was Henri-Paulin Panon Desbassayns (Réunion: 1732–1800), a planter, captain in the Indies battalion and knight of the Order of Saint Louis.
Henri's son was Pierre's grandfather, Philippe Panon Desbassayns de Richemont, first count of Richemont (Réunion: 1774–1840), an administrator of the Indies and Deputy of the Meuse.
Pierre's parents were Eugène Panon Desbassayns de Richemont, comte de Richemont (1800–1859) and Athénaïs Claire Joséphine Grâce Dupont de l'Etang (1809–1848).
His father, born in Paris, was Governor of the Comptoirs des Indes.

Life

Pierre Desbassyns de Richemont  married Marie Charlotte Victoire Tissot de la Barre de Mérona (1837–1926) on 27 April 1855 in Paris.
His wife was the granddaughter of Jean-Baptiste de Nompère de Champagny, Duc de Cadore, a Minister of Napoleon.
Their children were  Marie Panon Desbassayns de Richemont (1857–1917), Romuald Eugène Octave Alain Marie Panon Desbassayns de Richemont (1860–1945) and Marie-Madeleine Pauline Alice Humbline Pia Panon Desbassayns de Richemont (1862–1925).
He was made an officer of the Legion of Honour on 13 August 1860.
He occupied himself with archaeological and historical studies, and is known for his Archéologie chrétienne primitive (1870).

On 28 May 1871 Desbassyns de Richemont was elected representative of the French Indies in the National Assembly by 13,957 votes out of 29,606.
He sat with the center right.
He voted for the peace treaty with Prussia, for public prayers, for abrogation of the laws of exile, for the constituent powers of the Assembly, for acceptance of the resignation of Adolphe Thiers and against the constitutional laws.

On 26 March 1876 Desbassyns de Richemont  was unanimously elected Senator for the French Indies, and took his place on the right.
He voted for the dissolution of the chamber in 1877 demanded by the cabinet of Broglie and Fourtou, and consistently opposed the republican ministries.
He left office on 7 January 1882.
He was defeated in the senate election by Charles de Freycinet.
After leaving office he returned to his former life in aristocratic society and to his study of archaeology.
He died on 11 November 1912 in Paris.

Publications
Publications by Desbassyns de Richemont included:

Notes

Sources

 
 

1833 births
1912 deaths
French archaeologists
Members of the National Assembly (1871)
French Senators of the Third Republic
Senators of French India